Frederick Victor Arul (1917-2006) was a high-ranking Indian police officer and former director of Central Bureau of Investigation from Yangon. He was born in  Nazareth,   thoothukudi district

Early life and education 
Arul was born on 24 November 1917 in  Vazhayadi, Nazareth . He was educated at Loyola College and Madras Christian College in Chennai.

Tamil Nadu police 
He began his career in 1938 in the Andhra region of erstwhile Madras State. He served as a DSP, SDPO, Addl.SP and Senior Superintendent in the districts of West Godavari, Kadapa district, Tiruchirappalli district and Prakasam district. He also commanded several Armed Police battalions. He served as Deputy Inspector-General of Police in the then Tamil Nadu Criminal Investigation Department (CID), DIG of Madurai Range, and then the IG of Tamil Nadu . He also served as the Police Commissioner of Madras City for two terms, the first being from 1956 to 1959.

Central Bureau of Investigation 
He served as the Director of the Central Bureau of Investigation from 31 May 1968 to 6 May 1971.  He also became the first Indian to become the Vice-President of Interpol during his time in CBI serving in the Executive Committee of the Interpol as Vice-President for Asia in the 1970s.

References 

1917 births
2006 deaths
Directors of the Central Bureau of Investigation
Indian police officers
Loyola College, Chennai alumni
Madras Christian College alumni
Tamil Nadu Police
Interpol officials
University of Madras alumni